Government Post Graduate College Haripur located in Haripur Khyber Pakhtunkhwa, Pakistan. The college currently offers programs at Intermediate, Bachelor, Master and 4 years BS programs in various disciplines for which it is affiliated with University of Haripur.

Overview & History 
Government Post Graduate College Haripur is one of the college in Haripur. The college started in 1959 initially in a rented building but in 1962 the college was moved to its current campus. The college campus has well ventilated classrooms and well equipped science laboratories.

The college started Master programs in Mathematics and English in 2012, which was extended Chemistry in 2015. The college is now offering 4 years BS programs in various disciplines.

Programs 
The college currently offers the following programs.

Intermediate
 FSc – Pre-Medical (2 years)
 FSc – Pre-Engineering (2 years)
 FSc – Computer Science (2 years)
 FA – General Science (2 years)
 FA – Humanities (2 years)

Master Level (2 years)
 MSc – Mathematics
 MSc - Chemistry
 MA - English

BS Degrees (4 years)
 BS Computer Science
 BS English
 BS Mathematics
 BS Chemistry
 BS Political Science
 BS Economics
 BS Physics
 BS Statistics
 BS Electronics
 BS Zoology
 BS Gender Studies
 BS Urdu

See also 
 University of Haripur

External links 
 Government Post Graduate College Haripur Official Website

References 

Haripur District
Public universities and colleges in Khyber Pakhtunkhwa